Msgr. Dr. Antonio Adolfo Pérez y Aguilar (20 March 1839 – 17 April 1926) was the fourth Bishop and  first Archbishop of San Salvador, El Salvador.

External links
Catholic-hierarchy.org entry for Antonio Adolfo Pérez y Aguilar

References 

1839 births
1926 deaths
20th-century Roman Catholic archbishops in El Salvador
Roman Catholic archbishops of San Salvador
Roman Catholic bishops of San Salvador